Denis Joseph Murphy (6 August 1936 – 21 June 1984), was an Australian Labor Party politician, historian and biographer. Murphy was born in Nambour, Queensland. He was the youngest of nine children and went to an all boys Catholic school, St Joseph's Nudgee College. After graduating, Murphy went on to study high school PE teaching and later became an educator at Redcliffe State High School. As Murphy worked he went back to university and completed his master's degree in Queensland's state enterprises in 1965 at the University of Queensland. In 1966 he left his job as a PE teacher and took on a full-time position as a lecturer at the University of Queensland. He taught there as an academic historian and wrote primarily on the history of the Australian Labor Party.

Murphy became a member of the Australian Labor Party 1967. During his time as a member in the 1970s, Murphy led a push for party reform, alongside Peter Beattie and Manfred Cross. He maintained his position at University of Queensland whilst he pushed for reform and completed biographies on a number of Queensland ALP figures, notably Thomas J. Ryan and Bill Hayden. In 1980 he was received the title of State Branch President and was elected to the Parliament of Queensland for the electorate of Stafford at the 1983 state election.

Murphy was diagnosed with cancer in 1983 and died in 1984, aged 47. He died before having the opportunity to make a speech as a Member of Parliament. Peter Beattie made a speech instead for Murphy and led a conference of over 200 delegates in a moment of silence in honor of Murphy's life. Murphy died in Brisbane, Queensland and is buried in Mooloolah Cemetery.

Early life 
Denis Murphy was born in Nambour, Queensland in 1936. His parents were Martin Murphy and Lilian May, née Campbell. He was the youngest of eight children and went to an all boys Catholic school, St Joseph's Nudgee College. Costar and Saunders (2011) report that "Murphy excelled academically and athletically, most notably in Cricket". In 1955, Murphy went on to study high school Physical Education (PE) teaching at Queensland Teachers' Training College. The next year he began teaching at Nundah State School.

Murphy married Gwendoline May Butcher in 1959 and one year later went on to teach in the United Kingdom coaching a senior cricket team until he returned to Brisbane in 1961. Once returning home, Murphy became an educator at Redcliffe State High School and then left this position in 1965. During his time at Redcliffe State High School, he worked at night doing furniture removals and at one point worked as a railway clerk. In addition to PE teaching, Murphy also taught mathematics and English. At 28 years old (1964) he joined the Australian Labor Party. In 1965 he was given the title of President of the Young Labor Association of Queensland and held this title until 1967.

As he worked he went back to university and studied part time, completing a Bachelor of Arts and receiving his PhD in 1965 at the University of Queensland. Murphy's doctorate was an analysis of T.J. Ryan, former premier of Queensland, which received positive responses by the University of Queensland Press, they soon after published it. In 1966 he left his job as a PE teacher and took on a full-time position at the University of Queensland.

Career 
In 1966, Denis Murphy began his career as a tertiary educator and worked at the University of Queensland (UQ) as a tutor in Australian History. Costar and Saunders  note that Murphy acquired this position after "completing a masters' qualifying thesis on Queensland's state enterprises". Two years later, as Murphy became increasingly active in the Australian Labor Party (ALP), he subsequently joined the Queensland Central Executive. He was employed by the University of Queensland History Department until 1984. During his time there he published two biographies on Labor politicians as well as five books with which he edited and wrote in collaboration with other tertiary academics. Before his rise in politics, he was an academic historian and researched extensively in Australian History. After working as a tutor in history at UQ for 3 years, Murphy later rose to senior tutor and then in 1975 became a senior lecturer. Bradley Bowden attributes Murphy's rise to his heavy involvement in the Australian Labor Party as he received access to archives by the State Secretary at the time, Tom Burns. Murphy wrote a number of biographies including thirteen submissions to the Australian Dictionary of Biography of which he later became the chairman of in 1974.

Whilst at UQ, Murphy oversaw an increase in learning opportunities within the history department as enrolments were raised 96 to 870 in 3 years by his efforts. This, however, had a negative impact on his written works as Murphy increased his teaching workload due to a lack of staff needed to support the increase in students. Bradley Bowden recounts that, during this period, Murphy was also Chair of the Departmental Assembly at UQ as well as Queensland Central Executive member and "Labor's candidate in the 1972 federal election". This summation of roles resulted in Murphy's political theses to become underdeveloped and less respected by other academics. Critics scrutinised Murphy's publications at one point due to an "absence of theory... and providing syntheses of the work of others without checking its veracity".

Throughout his time as an historian, Murphy began a push for party reform within the Australian Labor Party's Queensland branch. In 1978 Murphy presented a speech for over 300 party members and critiqued the capabilities of the current Queensland Central Executive leaders. The majority ruled in favor of Murphy's recommendation for a shift in the party and he was named the leader of a new reform team. During this time Murphy led a push for a restructure in the ALP and attained a pilots license in order to fly statewide to share his message. Anthony Albanese, the 2021 Leader of the Australian Labor Party states that Murphy led reforms in "affirmative action along with a new pre-selection procedure providing branch pre-selection (which was) reviewed by a 40 person electoral college." A story in the Sydney Morning Herald  stated that "Murphy believes that the reforms he is seeking are the only way future historians will be able to talk about Labor in Power''.

In 1981 he was elected the President of the Queensland State Labor Party. Albanese claims that Murphy positioned the ALP to overcome the problems caused by Joh Bjelke-Petersen, the conservative premier at the time. Murphy published an article titled Queensland's Image and Australian Nationalism (1978), in which he criticized the premier stating, "Mr. Bjelke Petersen... is one of the less stable and less competent Premiers the state has had". In 1980, Murphy wrote Labor in Power, which received negative responses particularly from Bede Nairn, another Labor Party Historian, "attacked the book's uncritical discussions of Labor and its affiliated unions". Despite criticisms and any negative responses to Murphy's political engagements, in 1983 he won the position of The State Seat of Stafford in the State Election.

Death 
Not long after his election into the Liberal Seat of Stafford in 1983, Denis Murphy was diagnosed with an unspecified cancer and was ill for eight months before he died on the 21st of June 1984. He did not live to give his maiden speech and the speech was instead given by Mr. Peter Beattie. The Sydney Morning Herald reports that in Mr Beattie's speech he said "As a close personal friend of Denis Murphy I want to pay strongest possible tribute to him on behalf of the Labor Movement and the people of Queensland." After Beattie's speech, over 200 delegates attending the conference stood together and bowed their heads in a minutes silence to pay respects to Murphy.

Legacy 
After Murphy's death, a number of tributes were made to commemorate his life and the work that he did during his time as an historian and Labor Politician. The Journal of the Royal Historical Society of Queensland wrote a tribute paper for him titled Tropical Transformations: Denis Murphy in Queensland History. The dedication was co-authored by a number of Murphy's former colleagues at the University of Queensland such as Kay Saunders, Murray Johnson and Brian Costar. An obituary for Murphy was written by Roger Joyce in 1984 and published by the Australian Society for the Study of Labour History. Roger Joyce was a professor at the University of Queensland and oversaw Murphy's PhD on T.J Ryan when Denis was still a student. Joyce states in the obituary that "Denis was one of the best examples of the "fire in the belly" school of historians." In 2014, 30 years after Murphy's death, Anthony Albanese made a speech on the power of communities and based his discussion on the life of Denis Murphy. Albanese spoke highly of Murphy in his speech and stated that "Denis was one of Queensland Labor's greatest leaders."

Written Works 

 Prelude to Power: The Rise of the Labour Party in Queensland 1885-1915 (1970)
 T.J. Ryan: A Political Biography (1975)
 Labour In Politics (1975)
 Queensland Political Portraits 1859-1965 (1978)
 Ken Laidlaw: A White Collar Union Leader (1979)
 Labour in Power: The Labour Party and Governments in Queensland (1980)
 Hayden: A Political Biography (1980)
 The Big Strikes: Queensland 1889-1965 (1983)

Memorial lecture series

A lecture series in honour of Murphy was established.  Lectures in the series have included the following:

1991: John Kerin MP, Treasurer. 30 August.
1992: Peter Beattie, MLA, Member for Brisbane Central. A reformist party in government: the courage needed for reform. 14 November.
1993: Barry Jones, former Labor MP. The agenda for the 1990s. 31 July.

2014: 24th Lecture. Anthony Albanese, M.P., former cabinet minister.  Denis Murphy and the power of communities, 8 November.
2015: 25th Lecture. Douglas Cameron, Senator for NSW,  22 August.
2016: 26th Lecture. Sam Dastyari, Senator for NSW.
2017: Linda Burney, MP. 21 October.

See also

 D.J. Murphy, 1975, T.J. Ryan: a political biography, St Lucia, Brisbane: University of Queensland Press.
 Denis Murphy, 1980, Hayden: a political biography, Sydney: Angus and Robertson.
 Bradley Bowden, 2016, "Denis Murphy, the University of Queensland and Labour History, 1966-83, A Reassessment," Labour History, No 110 (May 2016), pp. 125–142.

References

External links
 Denis Murphy display at the University of Queensland Library

1936 births
1984 deaths
Deaths from cancer in Queensland
Members of the Queensland Legislative Assembly
People from Nambour, Queensland
Australian Labor Party members of the Parliament of Queensland
20th-century Australian politicians
University of Queensland alumni
Australian historians
Australian biographers
Australian educators